Aleksey Semyonovich Zhivotov (Russian: Алексей Семенович Животов, 1 November or 14 November 1904 – 27 August 1964) was a Russian composer, who was born in Kazan and died in Leningrad. He studied at the Leningrad Conservatory with Vladimir Shcherbachyov. He was a committee member of the Leningrad Composers' Union. His best-known works are his song cycles. 

He lived to the age of 59, and there is very little on his life via primary sources, biographical information, or other records.

Works 

 Sketches for Nonet (1929)
 Suite for a large orchestra (1928)
 "West" symphonic cycle (1932)
 Festive Overture
 Heroic March
 Theatrical Suite
 Dance Suite

Filmography 

 1932 - Glory of the world
 1937 - For the Soviet Motherland
 1955 - Twelfth Night

References

Russian male classical composers
20th-century classical composers
1904 births
1964 deaths
20th-century Russian male musicians